Gruithuisen may refer to:

 Franz von Gruithuisen (1774–1852), Bavarian physician and astronomer
 Gruithuisen (crater), on the Moon
 Gruithuisen Domes (disambiguation), two lunar domes